Stefano Valli (born 21 March 1969 in San Marino) is a Sammarinese racing driver.

Career
Valli competed in two rounds of the 2001 European Super Touring Championship for GDL Racing. He finished third in the 2002 Italian Super Production Championship.

In 2005 he raced at three rounds of the World Touring Car Championship (WTCC) for Zerocinque Motorsport, which also doubled up as rounds of the Italian Superturismo Championship. He also competed in the 2005 European Touring Car Cup at ACI Vallelunga Circuit for Zerocinque. In 2006 Valli and Zerocinque competed in two rounds of the WTCC. He also attended the ETC Cup, this time at Autódromo do Estoril, finishing sixth in the Super Production class.

Racing record

Complete World Touring Car Championship results
(key) (Races in bold indicate pole position) (Races in italics indicate fastest lap)

References

External links

1969 births
Living people
Sammarinese racing drivers
World Touring Car Championship drivers
European Touring Car Championship drivers
European Touring Car Cup drivers